British NVC community MC10 (Festuca rubra - Plantago spp. maritime grassland) is one of the maritime cliff communities in the British National Vegetation Classification system. It is one of five communities categorised as maritime sea-cliff grasslands.

This community is found widely in coastal areas. There are three subcommunities.

Community composition

Five constant species are found in this community:
 Red Fescue (Festuca rubra)
 Buck's-horn Plantain (Plantago coronopus)
 Ribwort Plantain (Plantago lanceolata)
 Sea Plantain (Plantago maritima)
 Creeping Bent (Agrostis stolonifera)

Five rare species are associated with this community:
 Purple Milk-vetch (Astragalus danicus)
 Purple Oxytropis (Oxytropus halleri)
 Scottish Primrose (Primula scotica)
 Spring Squill (Scilla verna)
 Western Clover (Trifolium occidentale)

Distribution

This community is found in coastal areas on the west coast of Britain from Devon and Cornwall north to Shetland, with outlying examples in southeast Scotland and Northumberland.

Subcommunities

There are three subcommunities:
 the Armeria maritima subcommunity
 the Carex panicea subcommunity
 the Schoenus nigricans subcommunity

References

 Rodwell, J. S. (2000) British Plant Communities Volume 5 - Maritime communities and vegetation of open habitats  (hardback),  (paperback)

MC10